Siavash Alamouti is an Iranian-born business executive, entrepreneur. and electrical engineer. He is the Executive Vice President of Innovation R&D at Wells Fargo, and the executive chairman of Mimik Technology, Inc. He is known for the 1998 invention of the Alamouti's code, a type of space–time block code.

Early life and education
Siavash Alamouti was born on March 16, 1962, in Tehran, Iran. He graduated from Kharazmi Highschool in 1979, and attended Sharif University of Technology in 1980 for one year, and was expelled during the Iranian Cultural Revolution. Alamouti, received B.A.Sc. (1989) and M.A.Sc. (1992) degrees in Electrical Engineering from the University of British Columbia.

He holds dual citizenship of Canada and the United States.

Alamouti started his professional career at MPR Teltech, part of BC Telephone Company (now Telus) in Vancouver, where he worked on early mobile data protocols including cellular digital packet data (CDPD).

Career 

In 1995, he joined McCaw Cellular (now AT&T Wireless) as a Senior Scientist where he worked on the physical and MAC layer design of United States’ first commercial OFDM/MIMO system, known as Project Angel. He worked at several other companies prior to 2004, including Vivato, Cadence, McCaw Cellular, and MPR Teltech. He was an Intel Fellow and the CTO of Mobile Wireless Group at Intel, starting in 2004. Alamouti supported Intel's Mobile WiMAX technology.

Siavash Alamouti was the Group R&D Director at Vodafone Group from March 2010 until 2013.

He was awarded the 2022 Marconi Prize.

Alamouti's code 
He invented a 2xN MIMO scheme which today is referred to as the Alamouti's code (or Alamouti code). Alamouti’s October 1998 paper in IEEE Journal on Selected Areas of Communications (volume 16, number 8) was selected by IEEE Communication Society for publication in, The Best of the Best: Fifty Years of Communications and Networking Research (2007).

Alamouti's code provided some inspiration for the development of more useful and general Space Time Block Codes  by others including Nambirajan Seshadri, Vahid Tarokh, Robert Calderbank, and Hamid Jafarkhani. Tarokh, Jafarkhani and Alamouti received the 2013 IEEE Eric E. Sumner award "For contributions to block signaling for multiple antennas".

References

Iranian emigrants to the United States
Iranian engineers
21st-century Iranian inventors
Living people
Iranian chief technology officers
Iranian expatriate academics
1962 births